Ethella Chupryk (Ukrainian: Етелла Чуприк; 20 June 1964 – 25 December 2019) was a Ukrainian  pianist and Professor of piano at the Mykola Lysenko National Music Academy in Lviv, Ukraine.

Childhood
Ethella Chupryk was born in Vynohradiv, Zakarpattia Oblast, in a musical family. At the age of three, Etelka made a lifelong friendship with the piano. By the age of five she performed her first public concert performing Chopin's Waltz No. 7 in C sharp minor and Schubert's "Serenade".

After finishing musical school (at Judith Gergely's class) and musical college  (at Mary Valkovsky's class), in 1986 she entered the Mykola Lysenko Conservatory in Lviv; she became an internationally renowned pianist under the supervision of Maryna Kryh., piano professor of the Conservatory. Then she took master classes at the Moscow Conservatory with pianist teachers such as Yevgeny Malinyin, Vera Gornostayeva, Vladimir Viardo and Vladimir Krajnyev.

Etelka became laureate at several international competitions: 1988 - Lysenko Competition in Kyiv (First Prize) 1990 - Rakhmaninov Competition in Moscow (Third Prize) 1991 - Liszt Competition in Budapest (Third Prize).

Achievements
Shortly after starting her studies in Lviv, Chupryk began to compete in a number of international piano competitions. In 1988 she took first place at the Mykola Lysenko International Music Competition. In 1990, she traveled to Moscow to compete in what was then known as the All-Union Rachmaninov Competition and the precursor to the Sergey Rachmaninov International Piano Competition. Here she took third place. In September 1991 she was awarded third place at the Franz Liszt International Piano Competition in Budapest.

In 1994 she was awarded a gold medal and prize at the International Competition for Pianists in Memory of Vladimir Horowitz in Kyiv. Then she received an honorary bursary from the Richard Wagner association exhibitioner (Bayreuth, Germany, 1998).

At that time, she gave concerts in several European countries. She worked with renowned conductors including András Ligeti, Jerzy Salvarovsky, Robert de Koning, Karol Stryja and Jansug Kakhidze. In her repertoire, you can always find compositions by Bach, Mozart, Beethoven, Liszt, Bartók, Kodály and Chopin.

She published more than 30 CDs consisting of outstanding works of music literature at record labels Naxos, Philips, Amadis and IJMPS.

She was a professor at the Mykola Lysenko National Conservatory in Lviv and pianist in the Philharmonic Orchestra of Lviv County and Subcarpathian County.

In 1994, in recognition of this artistic work, she was named "Honoured Artist of Ukraine", in 2016 – "Folk Artist of Ukraine".

In 2018 – 2019 years, she gave concerts in Madrid, Barcelona, Brussels, Kyiv and Kharkiv, hosted by the Hungarian Embassy and Consulate General.

Repertoire 
Concerts for piano and orchestra:

J. S. Bach

Concerto No. 1 in D minor, BWV 1052

W. A. Mozart:

No. 20 in D minor, K. 466 (10 February 1785)
No. 21 in C major, K. 467 (9 March 1785)
No. 23 in A major, K. 488 (2 March 1786)
No. 24 in C minor, K. 491 (24 March 1786)

L. van Beethoven:

Piano Concerto No. 5 in E-flat major, Op. 73.

S. Rachmaninoff:

Piano Concerto No. 3 in D minor, Op. 30.
Piano Concerto No. 4 in G minor, Op. 40.
Symphony No. 2 in E Minor, Op. 27 Arranged as Piano Concerto No. 5 by Alexander Warenberg

J. Brahms:

Piano Concerto No. 2 in B-flat major, Op. 83.

F. Liszt:

Piano Concerto No. 1 in E-flat major, S. 124.
Piano Concerto No. 2 in A major, S. 125.

F. Chopin

Piano Concerto No. 1 in E minor, Op. 11.
Andante spianato et grande polonaise brillante in E-flat major, Op. 22.

P. I. Tchaikovsky

Piano Concerto No. 1 in B-flat minor, Op. 23.

E. Grieg

Piano Concerto in A minor, Op. 16.

G. Gershwin

Rhapsody in Blue for solo piano and jazz band

S. Prokofiev

Piano Concerto No. 2 in G minor, Op. 16.

Discography

External links 

 Homepage: Ethella Chupryk
 Official Facebook: https://www.facebook.com/ethella.chupryk1
 YouTube Official Channel: Ethella Chupryk Official YouTube Channel
YouTube topic: Ethella Chupryk
Discogs: https://www.discogs.com/artist/4142014-Ethella-Chuprik
AllMusic: https://www.allmusic.com/artist/ethella-chuprik-mn0002199821
Google Play: Ethella Chupryk Albums
Apple music: Ethella Chupryk
Amazon: Ethella Chupryk
Official Facebook of IJMPS: Izsak Jozsef Music Promotion Services
Naxos: Ethella Chupryk Albums
Liszt Festival in Gödöllő 2019

References 

1964 births
2019 deaths
People from Vynohradiv
Ukrainian pianists
Ukrainian women pianists
Ukrainian people of Hungarian descent
20th-century pianists
21st-century pianists
20th-century women pianists
21st-century women pianists